Barrie Joyce Rabinowitz Cassileth (née Rabinowitz; April 22, 1938 – February 26, 2022) was an American medical sociologist and researcher of complementary medicine and a critic of alternative medicine. She published extensively on alternative cancer treatments.

Early life
Cassileth was born in Philadelphia on April 22, 1938. Her father, Albert, initially owned a company that made socks, before operating a company that designed and installed custom kitchens together with her mother, Rosalind (Kaizen).  Cassileth studied social sciences at Bennington College, graduating with a Bachelor of Arts in 1959.  She subsequently obtained a Master of Science in psychology from the Albert Einstein College of Medicine in New York City, after taking a hiatus when her husband was called up for military service.  She ultimately resumed her studies and was later awarded a Doctor of Philosophy in medical sociology from the University of Pennsylvania in 1978.

Career
After completing her doctorate, Cassileth remained at the University of Pennsylvania as an assistant professor and taught medical sociology.  In that capacity, she contributed to the establishment of one of the first palliative cancer care programs in the US. She then taught at the University of North Carolina, Duke University, and Harvard University.  Cassileth edited The Cancer Patient: Social and Medical Aspects of Care, which was published in 1979.  She later wrote The Alternative Medicine Handbook (1998) and The Complete Guide to Complementary Therapies in Cancer Care (2011).

Starting in the 1970s, Cassileth championed integrative medicine entailing a "whole-person" method towards medical care.  She underscored how this was not intended to supplant traditional treatments, but add to it instead with practices that could reduce stress, alleviate discomfort, and ameliorate quality of life in general.  She also conducted a study with colleagues that was published in The New England Journal of Medicine in 1985, which found that a positive or negative attitude maintained by patients with advanced cancer had little impact on the result.  She noted how "for every anecdote about a cancer patient with a good attitude who lived, I can give you 200 about those who had good attitudes and died", and attributed survival to an individual's biology.  Cassileth also expressed misgivings about licensed medical practitioners counselling their patients to pursue alternative treatments to cancer, and maintained that "there are no viable alternatives to mainstream cancer care". She cited the example of Steve Jobs – who initially put off surgery in favor of alternative medicine – and was of the opinion that he "essentially committed suicide" by not seeking conventional treatment from the outset.

Cassileth was recruited by Paul Marks of the Memorial Sloan Kettering Cancer Center (MSKCC) in 1999 to establish an integrative care program at the hospital.  Under her leadership, the program eventually expanded to approximately 60 staff members with a separate building to work in.  She later founded the Integrative Medicine Service at the MSKCC and held the Laurance S. Rockefeller Chair in Integrative Medicine.  Cassileth also formed the Society for Integrative Oncology in 2003 and served as its inaugural president.  She worked at MSKCC until her retirement in 2016.

Personal life
Cassileth married her first husband, Peter Cassileth, in 1958.  Together, they had three children: Jodi, Wendy, and Gregory.  They eventually divorced. Her second marriage to H. Taylor Vaden also ended in divorce.  She later married Richard Cooper in 2008. They remained married until his death in 2016.

Death
Cassileth died at age of 83, on February 26, 2022, in an assisted-living facility in Beverly Hills, California. Her daughter, Jodi Cassileth Greenspan, said that she died due to complications of Alzheimer's disease.

Selected publications

Papers

Books

References

1938 births
2022 deaths
Alternative medicine researchers
Cancer researchers
Critics of alternative medicine
American sociologists
American women sociologists
21st-century American women
Writers from Philadelphia
Deaths from Alzheimer's disease